The Rally Islas Canarias El Corte Inglés was the third round of the 2013 European Rally Championship. The stages were tarmac. Jan Kopecký won the event after a huge fight with runner-up Craig Breen. Luis Monzón rounded off the podium places.

Results

Special stages

References

Canarias
Rally Islas Canarias